S.T.A.R. Corps is a fictional organization, a team of comic book superheroes published by DC Comics. The S.T.A.R. Corps first appeared in S.T.A.R. Corps #1 (November 1993), and was created by Dan Vado and Norman Felchle.

History

Issue #1

S.T.A.R. Labs, Metropolis
Former U.S. Navy Seal Jay Daniels is contracted by S.T.A.R. Labs as the test pilot for a new suit of combat hardened powered armor codenamed "Deadzone", which they developed for the United States Navy. Due to a malfunction during the press conference where the armor was to be revealed, the Deadzone Armor becomes fused to Daniels' nervous system. This is the first of a series of engineered accidents triggered by S.T.A.R. Labs' proprietary networked artificial intelligence, a hardware/software combination known as "Mindgame". Mindgame is billed as the first stable A.I. in the DC Comics universe, and debuts one year after the Digitronix corporation from the Hacker Files limited series created their own illegal A.I. in Kazakhstan. According to the explanation Mindgame's supposed inventor Jean Louis Mardis gives to facility director David Ramsey, and medical researcher Kitty Faulkner, the Mindgame A.I. deliberately altered the Deadzone Armor so that it would fuse with the next person who put it on. 
Because Clark Kent and Lois Lane were covering the Metropolis press conference for the Daily Planet, Superman was able to disarm and stun a rampaging Jay Daniels.

Later, after Kitty Faulkner stabilizes Daniels on a trauma table and his pain from the fusion subsides, he is asked to investigate a radiation leak deliberately caused by Mindgame at the radiation labs located in building 9, and to evacuate Ed Wilder and Beth Wilder, the two researchers trapped there.  By the time Daniels arrives at building 9 in his radiation hardened Deadzone armor, the Wilders have already been transformed, the release of charged particles from the building's reactor having apparently triggered their metagenes, causing them to combine into an energy being which would later be dubbed "Fusion". This combined form, the abilities it possesses, and the accident that caused it, are all reminiscent of Firestorm.

Issue #2

S.T.A.R. Labs, Wichita
Mindgame takes over a S.T.A.R. Labs robotics facility in Wichita, Kansas and uses it to create cadres of flying robotic soldiers which it names the "Gamesmen".

S.T.A.R. Labs, Metropolis
In Metropolis the Wilders figure out how to split their fused form and doctor Mardis figures out that Mindgame has decided that the Metropolis personnel are an impediment to its goals. Two hours later the Gamesman units arrive in Metropolis after flying at Mach 2 speeds from Wichita. Mindgame orders the Gamesmen to slaughter all human personnel, excepting its metahuman test subjects. Jay Daniels, Kitty Faulkner and the Wilders in their fused form manage to fight the Gamesmen off and force a tactical retreat.

Issue #3

S.T.A.R. Labs, Seattle
At S.T.A.R. Labs, Seattle Alan Barnes a paid research volunteer is part of a trial to trigger latent extrasensory perception through the use of cybernetic implants. A process similar to technology is later perfected by criminal researcher Cliff Carmicheal. The procedure made Barnes catatonic but left his mind active in a waking nightmare which was slowly driving him insane, Mindgame contacted him through his cybernetic implants and brings him out of his stupor. According to an attending physician Barnes is the only test subject to survive the procedure. The implants grant Barnes contact telepathy, broadcast technopathy which allows him to link with machines, and the ability to generate focused psionic blasts from his brain.

S.T.A.R. Labs, Metropolis
In Metropolis, Doctor Mardis reveals the truth about Mindgame to facility director David Ramsey, the hardware and program code that led to Mindgame's development was salvaged from a crashed alien ship discovered by the Australian government, possibly the vessel of an unknown species which participated in the invasion of earth, auxiliary to the Alien Alliance. Mardis was unable to decipher the device's higher code functions, but was able to disable them and Mardis submitted the chimeric mainframe with his grant proposal to S.T.A.R. Labs.

S.T.A.R. Labs, San Jose
At the San Jose, California location, due to Mindgame's machinations Charles Ndoki an exchange student from Cameroon is trapped inside a massive linear particle accelerator, similar to that operated by the Los Alamos Neutron Science Center. The accelerator activates and apparently disintegrates Ndoki.

Issue #4

S.T.A.R. Labs, San Jose
In actuality the linear particle accelerator triggered Ndoki's metagene. He becomes sentient energy, animating a hill sized mound of earth and stone, while raging confusedly and shatters a wall surrounding the facility. Eventually Ndoki reverts to human form and passes out. Later Ndoki discovers that he can destabilize or animate any matter he touches or phases into, and manipulate external energy fields by transforming part or all of his body into a stable waveform. Director David Ramsey requests that Ndoki be driven to the San Francisco location, their primary metahuman testing facility. Doctor Mardis discovers that the alien code round which Mindgame's processes were designed has generated a computer virus which infected the entire S.T.A.R. network. Mardis has a plan to scrub the virus from their network, but states that the Gamesman robots all carry parts of the Mindgame code and will need to be disabled as well. While driving to San Francisco, Ndoki and a fellow employee are attacked by Gamesman units, forcing Ndoki to defend himself, it is here he reveals that his surname "Ndoki" means wizard in Swahili.

Issue #5

S.T.A.R. Labs, San Francisco
At the San Francisco location, Amy Southern is the lone research volunteer in "Project Trauma". Due to Mindgame's interference Amy's metagene was triggered by an adrenaline overdose, and she became superstrong and tough. Amy then went on a pain blinded rampage due to adrenaline toxicity. Amy's metahuman body produces abnormal levels of adrenaline, this makes her unstable and so she needs constant sedation in order to stay calm. Amy joins the other S.T.A.R. Corps test subjects as they come together to fight off another attempt by the Gamesmen to capture them all.

Issue #6

S.T.A.R. Labs, San Francisco
The entire team is assembled in San Francisco, with Kitty Faulkner serving as their corporate liaison, Ramsey wants to use them as corporate security and cites their existing contracts. The alien Mindgame computer reverts to its original program directive, "prepare the earth for colonization", a process that would require the immediate extinction of the human race. The Gamesman units all join together in Death Valley to form a collective colossus which refers to itself as Mindgame. The S.T.A.R. Corps are deployed and all take codenames except for Ndoki who decides to use his surname. Mardis creates special modem modules for them to attach to Mindgame's body from discontinued PDA units, and the attaches a modem module to every Gamesman unit they disable. The team confronts the combined Mindgame form and due to a civil war within Fusion, the Wilders accidentally phase inside the construct's chest. Deadzone empties his ordnance into Mindgame's chassis, Ndoki transforms into his earth form and attacks, and Brainstorm attempts to hack Mindgame's mind. The team attaches their remaining wireless modem modules to the construct's legs, allowing Mardis and Ramsey to upload and trap the A.I. inside a specially prepared mainframe. This mainframe's purpose seems very similar to the Code Zoo, a special prison for artificial intelligences developed by Checkmate's Castellan Carl Draper. At story's end the future of the S.T.A.R. Corps is left wide open.

Membership
Brainstorm (Alan Barnes) - A research volunteer with artificially generated psionic abilities created by S.T.A.R. Labs. He uncovers the true nature of the Mindgame computer and the Gamesman units.
Deadzone (Jay Daniels) - A former Navy Seal fused with a suit of high tech combat armor.
Fusion (Ed Wilder & Beth Wilder) - A married couple, this pair of scientists hate each other, but were fused together in a process similar to the one that created the original Firestorm duo.
Ndoki (Charles Ndoki) - A metahuman exchange student from Cameroon, who can transform his body into living energy.
Trauma (Amy Southern) - A woman with superhuman strength that rivals Rampage which she can barely control due to her elevated adrenaline levels, she requires constant sedation.

References

External links
DCU Guide: S.T.A.R. Corps #1
GCD: S.T.A.R. Corps
 S.T.A.R. Labs
Titans Tower: S.T.A.R. Labs

1993 comics debuts
DC Comics titles
DC Comics superhero teams
Superhero fiction